La Teniente is a Mexican drama television series premiered on Azteca 7 on September 24, 2012, and concluded on November 1, 2012. The series is created and produced by Benjamín Salinas and Roberto González for Azteca 7 and distributed by Comarex and TV Azteca Internacional. It stars María Fernanda Yepes as the titular character.

Cast

Main 
 María Fernanda Yepes as Teniente Roberta Ballesteros
 Matías Novoa as Teniente Nicolás Alejo
 Héctor Arredondo as Capitán Antonio Volante
 Armando Torrea as Teniente Adán Peña
 Fernando Sarfatti as Comodoro Francisco Reygadas
 Sylvia Saenz as Teniente Luz "Lucy" Idalia Contreras
 Luis Cárdenas as Almirante Torreblanca
 Jorge Luis Vázquez as Teniente de Navío Alexis Madariaga

Recurring 
 Citlali Galindo as Marta
 Germán Valdés III as Pedro Volante 
 León Peraza as Teniente Héctor Ramos
 Coral de la Vega as Marisol
 Raúl Aranda-Lee as Contraalmirante De La Barquera
 Hugo Catalán as Javier Guerrero
 Anna Ciocchetti as Esmeralda
 Víctor González as Teniente Juan Alejo
 Javier Díaz Dueñas as Vicealmirante Facundo Ballesteros
 Juan Martín Jauregui as Bruno Santoscoy

References

External links 
 

2012 Mexican television series debuts
2012 Mexican television series endings
Mexican television series
Azteca 7 original programming